Wiley Thompson (September 23, 1781 – December 28, 1835) was a United States representative from Georgia.

Born in Amelia County, Virginia, Thompson moved to Elberton, Georgia, and served as a commissioner of the Elbert County Academy in 1808. He served in the Georgia Senate from 1817 to 1819 and was appointed Major General of the Fourth Division of the Georgia Militia in November 1817, a position in which he served until his resignation in November 1824.

Thompson was elected as a Democratic-Republican to the 17th United States Congress and reelected as a Crawford Republican to the 18th Congress. Thompson was then elected as a Jacksonian to the 19th and three successive Congresses (20th, 21st and 22nd). His congressional tenure spanned from March 4, 1821, through March 3, 1833.

After his congressional service, Thompson served as a delegate to the State constitutional convention in 1833. He became an Indian agent to the Seminoles and was appointed in 1834 to superintend the removal of the Seminoles from Florida. This episode of his life was artistically described by Thomas Mayne Reid in the 1858 novel Osceola. Thompson was subsequently killed by a band of Seminoles led by Osceola at Fort King, Florida, on December 28, 1835, and was buried on his estate in Elberton.

Notes

References

 Smith, Gordon Burns, History of the Georgia Militia, 1783-1861, Volume One, Campaigns and Generals, Milledgeville: Boyd Publishing, 2000. ASIN:B003L1PRKI.

External links
 Grave of General Wiley Thompson historical marker

1781 births
1835 deaths
People from Amelia County, Virginia
People from Elberton, Georgia
Georgia (U.S. state) state senators
United States Indian agents
Democratic-Republican Party members of the United States House of Representatives from Georgia (U.S. state)
Jacksonian members of the United States House of Representatives from Georgia (U.S. state)
Deaths by firearm in Florida
Assassinated American politicians
American slave owners
19th-century American politicians